Gaius Octavius Tidius Tossianus Lucius Javolenus Priscus was a Roman senator and jurist who flourished during the Flavian dynasty. Many of his judgments are quoted in the Digest. Priscus served as suffect consul for the nundinium (period) September to December 86AD as the colleague of Aulus Bucius Lappius Maximus.

Name

The shorter version of his name is "Lucius Javolenus Priscus", or simply "Javolenus Priscus". However, several inscriptions give his name as "Lucius Javolenus Priscus".

Anthony Birley notes that his names "Javolenus, Tidius, and Tossianus all point to Umbria, and specifically Iguvium as the origo of Priscus." However Birley points to Géza Alföldy's argument that he ought to be connected with the Octavii of Nedium in Dalmatia where Javolenus Priscus had been honored. "It therefore seems quite probable that he was born a C. Octavius, and that he received his other names by adoption into an Umbrian family." However, Salomies argues that if he was adopted, "from the order of the names we should surely rather conclude that he was a L. Iavolenus adopted by a C. Octavius."

Imperial career 
There is no historical record of Javolenus Priscus prior to his taking command of Legio IV Flavia Felix, stationed near Burnum, in modern Croatia; it may be he was adlected into the Senate inter praetorios. He was next appointed legatus legionis or commander of Legio III Augusta in 83, serving as the de facto governor of Numidia. Birley believes it was in 84 when Javolenus Priscus came to Roman Britain and served as a juridicus (senior judge) and remained there for two years. He returned to Rome where he held his consulship; becoming a consul was considered the highest honor of the Roman state. A military diploma attests that on 26 October 90 Priscus was governor of Germania Superior. He was governor of the province of Syria at the beginning of Trajan's reign. For the term 101/102 he was proconsul of Africa, which occupied the territory of modern Tunisia. Returning once again to Rome, Priscus was co-opted into the College of Pontiffs, the most important of the four major colleges of ancient Roman priests; their duties included overseeing the state cult and providing advice on sacral law.

Career as a jurist 
Birley notes that Javolenus Priscus' "principal claim to fame was as a jurist." Of the many citations of his legal opinions, one concerns the will of Seius Saturninus, archigubernus ex classe Britannica, a case which must have come before him while he was juridicus in Britain. He was the leader of the Sabinian school, and was the teacher of the jurist Salvius Julianus.

He is best known for his saying that "every definition in civil law is dangerous, for rare are those that cannot be subverted." (Omnis definitio in iure civili periculosa est; parum est enim, ut non subverti posset.)

References 

1st-century Romans
2nd-century Romans
1st-century Roman governors of Syria
Ancient Romans in Britain
Suffect consuls of Imperial Rome
Roman governors of Syria
Roman governors of Africa
Ancient Roman jurists
Octavii
60s births
120s deaths
Year of birth uncertain
Year of death uncertain